Sasni is a town and a nagar panchayat in Hathras district in the Indian state of Uttar Pradesh.

Demographics
 India census, Sasni had a population of 12,943. Males constitute 53% of the population and females 47%. Sasni has an average literacy rate of 63%, higher than the national average of 59.5%: male literacy is 70%, and female literacy is 56%. In Sasni, 16% of the population is under 6 years of age.

References

Cities and towns in Hathras district